Raymond Nixon (born September 10, 1984) is an American professional basketball who last played for Tampereen Pyrintö (basketball) in Finland.

External links
Finnish League Profile
Eurobasket Profile

1984 births
Living people
American expatriate basketball people in Finland
American expatriate basketball people in France
American expatriate basketball people in Japan
American men's basketball players
Basketball players from Milwaukee
Centers (basketball)
Namika Lahti players
Otsuka Corporation Alphas players
Power forwards (basketball)
San-en NeoPhoenix players
Shiga Lakes players
Tigers Tübingen players
Wisconsin Badgers men's basketball players